The non-marine molluscs of Mexico are a part of the molluscan wildlife of Mexico. A number of species of non-marine molluscs are found in the wild in Mexico.

There are about 1,178 species and subspecies of terrestrial gastropods in the Mexico.

There are not enough records of terrestrial gastropods from states of Aguascalientes and Tlaxcala.

Freshwater gastropods 

Neritidae
 Clypeolum latissimum (Broderip, 1833)
 Neritina virginea (Linnaeus, 1758)
 Vitta clenchi (Russell, 1940)
 Vitta usnea (Röding, 1798)

Ampullariidae
 Pomacea cerasum (Hanley, 1854)
 Pomacea flagellata (Say, 1829)
 Pomacea cumingii (King & Broderip, 1831)
 Pomacea catemacensis (H. B. Baker 1922)
 Pomacea picta (Reeve, 1856)

Viviparidae
 Viviparus inornatus (Binney, 1865)

Pachychilidae
 Amnipila pila (Pilsbry & Hinkley, 1910)
 Pachychilus apheles F. G. Thompson, 1967
 Pachychilus apis (I. Lea & H.C. Lea, 1851)
 Pachychilus atratus Pilsbry & Hinkley, 1910
 Pachychilus chrysalis (Brot, 1872)
 Pachychilus corpulentus F. G. Thompson, 1967
 Pachychilus corvinus (Morelet, 1849)
 Pachychilus dalli Pilsbry, 1896
 Pachychilus glaphyrus (Morelet, 1849)
 Pachychilus graphium (Morelet, 1849)
 Pachychilus hellerii (Brot, 1862)
 Pachychilus humerosus Pilsbry & Hinkley, 1910
 Pachychilus indiorum (Morelet, 1849)
 Pachychilus largillierti (Philippi, 1843)
 Pachychilus larvatus (Brot, 1877)
 Pachychilus liebmanni (Philippi, 1848)
 Pachychilus moctezumensis (Pilsbry & Hinkley, 1910)
 Pachychilus pilsbryi von Martens, 1899
 Pachychilus pleurotoma Pilsbry & Hinkley, 1910
 Pachychilus pluristriatus (Say, 1831)
 Pachychilus potomarchus Pilsbry, 1892
 Pachychilus radix (Brot, 1872)
 Pachychilus rasconensis Thiele, 1928
 Pachychilus rubidus (Lea, 1856)
 Pachychilus saussurei (Brot, 1874)
 Pachychilus schiedeanus (Philippi, 1843)
 Pachychilus schumoi Pilsbry, 1931
 Pachychilus suturalis Pilsbry & Hinkley, 1910
 Pachychilus tristis Pilsbry & Hinkley, 1910
 Pachychilus turati (A. Villa & G. B. Villa, 1854)
 Pachychilus vallesensis Hinkley, 1907

Pleuroceridae
 Lithasiopsis crassus Thompson, 1959
 Lithasiopsis darnelli Thompson, 1959
 Lithasiopsis hinkleyi Pilsbry, 1910
 Lithasiopsis mexicanus Pilsbry, 1910

Assimineidae
 Angustassiminea californica (Tryon, 1865)
 Assiminea cienegensis Hershler, Liu & Lang, 2007

Cochliopidae
 Aroapyrgus alleei Morrison, 1946
 Aroapyrgus clenchi (Goodrich & Van der Schalie, 1937)
 Aroapyrgus guatemalensis (Fischer & Crosse, 1891)
 Aroapyrgus mexicanus (Pilsbry, 1910)
 Aroapyrgus orizabensis (Crosse & Fischer, 1891)
 Aroapyrgus pasionensis (Goodrich & Van der Schalie, 1937)
 Balconorbis sabinasense Czaja, Cardoza-Martínez & Estrada-Rodríguez, 2019
 Chorrobius crassilabrum Hershler, Liu & Landye, 2011
 Coahuilix hubbsi Taylor, 1966
 Coahuilix landyei Hershler, 1985
 Cochliopina compacta (Pilsbry, 1910)
 Cochliopina francesae (Goodrich & Van der Schalie, 1937)
 Cochliopina infundibulum (Martens, 1899)
 Cochliopina milleri Taylor, 1966
 Cochliopina picta (Pilsbry, 1910)
 Cochliopina riograndensis (Pilsbry & Ferriss, 1906)
 Emmericiella longa (Pilsbry, 1909)
 Emmericiella novimundi (Pilsbry, 1909)
 Eremopyrgus elegans Hershler, Liu & Landye, 2002
 Juturnia coahuilae (Taylor, 1966)
 Littoridina crosseana (Pilsbry, 1910)
 Littoridina orcutti (Pilsbry, 1928)
 Littoridinops monroensis (Frauenfeld, 1863)
 Littoridinops tampicoensis (Pilsbry & Hinkley, 1907)
 Littoridinops tenuipes (Couper, 1844)
 Mexicenotica xochii Grego, Angyal & Liévano-Beltrán, 2019
 Mexipyrgus carranzae Taylor, 1966
 Mexithauma quadripaludium Taylor, 1966
 Minckleyella balnearis Hershler, Liu & Landye, 2011
 Paludiscala caramba Taylor, 1966
 Phreatoceras taylori (Hershler & Longley, 1986)
 Pseudotryonia mica Hershler, Liu & Landye, 2011
 Pseudotryonia pasajae Hershler, Liu & Landye, 2011
 Pyrgophorus coronatus (Pfeiffer, 1840)
 Pyrgophorus cisterninus (Küster, 1852)
 Pyrgophorus spinosus (Call & Pilsbry, 1886)
 Pyrgophorus cenoticus Grego, Angyal & Beltrán, 2019
 Tepalcatia bakeri (Pilsbry, 1891)
 Tepalcatia polia (Thompson & Hershler, 1991)
 Tepalcatia tela Thompson & Hershler, 2002
 Texadina sphinctostoma (Abbott & Ladd, 1951)
 Tryonia allendae Hershler, Liu & Landye, 2011
 Tryonia angosturae Hershler, Liu & Landye, 2011
 Tryonia chuviscarae Hershler, Liu & Landye, 2011
 Tryonia contrerasi Hershler, Liu & Landye, 2011
 Tryonia dugesiana (Morrison, 1945)
 Tryonia hertleini (Drake, 1956)
 Tryonia imitator (Pilsbry, 1899)
 Tryonia julimesensis Hershler, Liu & Landye, 2011
 Tryonia mariae (Morrison, 1945)
 Tryonia minckleyi Hershler, Liu & Landye, 2011
 Tryonia molinae Hershler, Liu & Landye, 2011
 Tryonia ovata Hershler, Liu & Landye, 2011
 Tryonia peregrina Hershler, Liu & Landye, 2011
 Tryonia pilsbryi (Morrison, 1945)
 Tryonia porrecta (Mighels, 1845)
 Tryonia santarosae Hershler, Landye, Liu, De la Maza-Benignos, Ornelas & Carson, 2014
 Tryonia seemani (Frauenfeld, 1863)
 Tryonia shikueii Hershler, Landye, Liu, De la Maza-Benignos, Ornelas & Carson, 2014
 Tryonia taylori Hershler, Liu & Landye, 2011
 Tryonia zaragozae Hershler, Liu & Landye, 2011

Hydrobiidae
 Cincinnatia integra (Say, 1829)
 Ecrobia truncata (Vanatta, 1924)
 Pyrgulopsis acarinatus (Hershler, 1985)
 Pyrgulopsis bernardina (Taylor, 1987)
 Pyrgulopsis brandi (Drake, 1953)
 Pyrgulopsis californiensis (Gregg & Taylor, 1965)
 Pyrgulopsis cedrosensis (Pilsbry, 1927)
 Pyrgulopsis chihuahua (Pilsbry, 1928)
 Pyrgulopsis manantiali (Hershler, 1985)
 Pyrgulopsis minckleyi (Taylor, 1966)
 Pyrgulopsis palomasensis (Pilsbry, 1895)
 Pyrgulopsis patzcuarensis Pilsbry, 1891
 Pyrgulopsis thompsoni Hershler, 1988

Lithoglyphidae
 Phreatomascogos gregoi Czaja & Estrada-Rodríguez, 2019
 Pterides bisinulabris Pilsbry, 1909
 Pterides pterostoma Pilsbry, 1909
 Pterides rhabdus Pilsbry, 1909

Valvatidae
 Valvata beltrami Contreras-Arquieta, 1993
 Valvata humeralis Say, 1829

Lymnaeidae
 Galba bulimoides (Lea, 1841)
 Galba cubensis (Pfeiffer, 1839)
 Galba humilis (Say, 1822)
 Galba modicella (Say, 1825)
 Galba obrussa (Say, 1825) 
 Galba viator (Orbigny, 1835)
 Ladislavella elodes (Say, 1821)
 Lymnaea stagnalis (Linnaeus, 1758)
 Pseudosuccinea columella (Say, 1817)

Physidae
 Amecanauta jaliscoensis Taylor, 2003
 Austrinauta elatus (Gould, 1853)
 Chiapaphysa grijalvae Taylor, 2003
 Mayabina bullula (Crosse & Fischer, 1882)
 Mayabina polita Taylor, 2003
 Mayabina spiculata (Morelet, 1849)
 Mayabina tapanensis (Crosse & Fischer, 1882)
 Mexinauta aurantia (Carpenter, 1857)
 Mexinauta impluviatus (Morelet, 1849)
 Mexinauta nitens (Philippi, 1841)
 Mexinauta princeps (Philippi, 1846)
 Physella acuta (Draparnaud, 1805)
 Physella boucardi (Crosse and Fischer, 1881)
 Physella gyrina (Say, 1821)
 Physella mexicana (Philippi, 1841)
 Physella patzcuarensis (Pilsbry, 1891)
 Physella solidissima (Pilsbry, 1920) 
 Physella squalida (Morelet, 1851)
 Physella virgata (Gould, 1855)
 Ultraphysella sinaloae Taylor, 2003

Planorbidae
 Antillorbis aeruginosus (Morelet, 1851)
 Biomphalaria belizensis (Crosse & Fischer, 1878)
 Biomphalaria boucardianus (Preston, 1907)
 Biomphalaria gracilenta (Gould, 1855)
 Biomphalaria havanensis (Pfeiffer, 1839)
 Biomphalaria helophila (d'Orbigny, 1835)
 Biomphalaria orbicula (Morelet, 1849)
 Biomphalaria petenensis (Morelet, 1851)
 Biomphalaria retusus (Morelet, 1849)
 Biomphalaria subprona (Von Martens, 1899)
 Biomphalaria tepicensis (Von Martens, 1899)
 Drepanotrema anatinum (d'Orbigny, 1835)
 Drepanotrema cimex (Moricand, 1839)
 Drepanotrema cultratum (d'Orbigny, 1841)
 Drepanotrema depressissimum (Moricand, 1839)
 Drepanotrema kermatoides (d'Orbigny, 1835)
 Drepanotrema lucidum (Pfeiffer, 1839)
 Drepanotrema sumichrasti (Crosse & Fischer, 1879)
 Drepanotrema surinamense (Clessin, 1884)
 Ferrissia californica (Rowell, 1863)
 Ferrissia rivularis (Say, 1817)
 Gundlachia radiata (Guilding, 1828)
 Gyraulus circumstriatus (Tryon, 1866)
 Gyraulus deflectus (Say, 1824)
 Gyraulus parvus (Say, 1817)
 Hebetancylus excentricus (Morelet, 1851)
 Helisoma anceps (Menke, 1830)
 Laevapex papillaris (Von Martens, 1899)
 Laevapex sallei (Bourguignat, 1857)
 Menetus dilatatus (Gould, 1841)
 Micromenetus brogniartianus (Lea, 1842)
 Planorbella contrerasi (Pilsbry, 1920)
 Planorbella duryi (Wetherby, 1879)
 Planorbella foveale (Menke, 1830)
 Planorbella tenue (Dunker, 1850)
 Planorbella trivolvis (Say, 1817)
 Planorbula armigera (Say, 1821)

Land gastropods 

Helicinidae - 72 species

Veronicellidae
 Leidyula floridana (Leidy & Binney in Binney, 1851) - needs confirmation
 Leidyula moreleti (Fischer, 1871)
 Phyllocaulis gayi (Fischer, 1871) - needs confirmation
 Sarasinula dubia (Semper, 1885)
 Sarasinula plebeia (P. Fischer, 1868)

Subulinidae
 Allopeas gracile (Hutton, 1834)
 Allopeas micra (d’Orbigny, 1835)

Urocoptidae - 265 species

Spiraxidae - 246 species

Orthalicidae/Bulimulinae = Bulimulidae - 140 species

Agriolimacidae
 Deroceras laeve (Müller, 1774)
 Deroceras invadens Reise, Hutchinson, Schunack and Schlitt, 2011
 Deroceras reticulatum (Müller, 1774)

Pupillidae - 47 species

Polygyridae - 65 species

Xanthonychidae - 58 species
 Semiconchula custepecana Naranjo-García, Polaco & Pearce, 2000

Echinichidae
 Echinix granulata Thompson & Naranjo-García, 2012
 Echinix ochracea Thompson & Naranjo-García, 2012
 Echinix rugosa Thompson & Naranjo-García, 2012

Humboldtianidae - 49 species

Bivalvia

See also
 List of marine molluscs of Mexico

Lists of molluscs of surrounding countries:
 List of non-marine molluscs of the United States
 List of non-marine molluscs of Guatemala
 List of non-marine molluscs of Belize
 List of non-marine molluscs of Cuba

References

Further reading  
  Fischer P. H. & Crosse H. (1900). Études sur les mollusques terrestres et fluviatales du Mexique et du Guatemala. volume 2. Paris, 731 pp. + 72 plates.

non-marine
Molluscs
Mexico
Mexico
Mexico